Rustam Barotovich Kuvatov (born November 9, 1977 in Pavlodar) is a Kazakhstani race walker. He set a personal best time of 1:23:16 by finishing twelfth for the 20 km race walk at the Kazakh national walking championships. Kuvatov made his official debut for the 2004 Summer Olympics in Athens, where he placed thirty-seventh in the men's 50 km race walk, with a time of 4:13:40.

At the 2008 Summer Olympics, Kuvatov competed this time for the men's 20 km race walk. During the competition, he set an early pace and was narrowly ahead in the 4 km lap after the athletes had left the stadium. Reaching the 8 km lap, Kuvatov's strong lead came to an end, as he was passed by several race walkers including Ivano Brugnetti of Italy, and Paquillo Fernández of Spain, both of whom won gold and silver in the previous Olympics. Kuvatov entered the stadium and finished the entire run in forty-second place by ten seconds behind Serbia's Predrag Filipović, with a time of 1:28:25.

References

External links

NBC 2008 Olympics profile

Kazakhstani male racewalkers
Living people
Olympic athletes of Kazakhstan
Athletes (track and field) at the 2004 Summer Olympics
Athletes (track and field) at the 2008 Summer Olympics
People from Pavlodar
1977 births
Athletes (track and field) at the 2006 Asian Games
Asian Games competitors for Kazakhstan